Acrocephalosyndactyly is a group of autosomal dominant congenital disorders characterized by craniofacial (craniosynostosis) and hand and foot (syndactyly) abnormalities. When polydactyly is present, the classification is acrocephalopolysyndactyly. Acrocephalosyndactyly is mainly diagnosed postnatally, although prenatal diagnosis is possible if the mutation is known to be within the family genome.  Treatment often involves surgery in early childhood to correct for craniosynostosis and syndactyly.

Characteristics 
Acrocephalosyndactyly presents in numerous different subtypes, however, considerable overlap in symptoms occurs. Generally, all forms of acrocephalosyndactyly are characterized by craniofacial, hand, and foot abnormalities, such as premature closure of the fibrous joints in between certain bones of the skull, fusion of certain fingers or toes, and/or more than the normal number of digits. Some subtypes also involve structural heart deformations that are present at birth.

Cause
Most forms of acrocephalosyndactyly or acrocephalopolysyndactyly are inherited in autosomal dominant pattern, with the exclusion of Carpenter Syndrome which is inherited in autosomal recessive manner. De-novo mutations in different genes were reported to cause several types of acrocephalosyndactyly. Among known genetic changes, there are mutations in genes such as Fibroblast growth factor receptor (FGFR),  TWIST1,  and RAB23.  Genetically inherited acrocephalosyndactyly disorders all show high to complete penetrance with a variable expression. Increased paternal age is considered a risk factor in some cases.

Diagnosis

Prenatal Diagnosis 
Prenatal diagnosis is an option in some forms of acrocephalosyndactyly. A prenatal genetic diagnosis is only possible if the gene mutation responsible for the syndrome is known and the mutation causing the disease has been identified within the family genome. This can be done using amniocentesis or chorionic villus sampling, which test the embryonic stem cells in the amniotic fluid or placental cells, respectively. There has been a case of a prenatal diagnosis of Apert syndrome using fetoscopy.  Alternatively, there has been interest in using non-invasive techniques like ultrasound to detect fetal skull abnormalities.

Postnatal Diagnosis 
Most diagnoses of acrocephalosyndactyly occur after birth by assessing the physical symptoms of the infant. This can be supported with radiographic evaluation,  such as X-ray imaging, and molecular genetic testing, which looks for DNA mutations known to cause the disease. Molecular genetic testing typically occurs in the FGFR, TWIST1, and RAB23 genes.

Nomenclature/Classification 
There is no consistent nomenclature or classification across the different syndromes under the umbrella of acrocephalosyndactyly and acrocephalopolysyndactyly. Although acrocephalosyndactyly has been reported as early as the 18th century, the ACS and ACPS classifications only came in the latter 20th century. However, this classification may be outdated as it has been suggested that the distinction between acrocephalosyndactyly and acrocephalopolysyndactyly should be erased.

Currently, Noack syndrome (ACPS type I) is now classified as Pfeiffer syndrome (ACS type V); Goodman syndrome (ACPS type IV) is classified as a variation of Carpenter syndrome (ACPS type II); and different researchers have combined Apert (ASC type I), Crouzon (ASC type II), and Pfeiffer (ASC type V) syndrome into Apert-Crouzon and Crouzon-Pfeiffer syndrome.

Acrocephalosyndactyly type IV was formerly called Mohr Syndrome, however, it was later classified under Orofaciodigital syndrome type II. Pfeiffer syndrome was formerly type VI and Waardenburg type V, but this was changed sometime after 1966.  

Acrocephalosyndactyly (ACS):

 type I – Apert syndrome
 type II – Crouzon syndrome
 type III – Saethre–Chotzen syndrome
 Robinow-Sorauf syndrome suggested to be included in Saethre-Chotzen classification 
 type IV – Mohr syndrome (archaic) 
 type V – Pfeiffer syndrome
 Noack syndrome incorporated into Pfeiffer syndrome classification 

A related term, acrocephalopolysyndactyly (ACPS), refers to the inclusion of polydactyly to the presentation. It also has multiple types:

 type I – Noack syndrome (archaic) 
 type II – Carpenter syndrome
 Goodman syndrome incorporated into Carpenter syndrome classification 
 Summitt syndrome incorporated into Carpenter syndrome classification 
 type III – Sakati-Nyhan-Tisdale syndrome
 type IV –  Goodman syndrome (archaic)

Treatment

Craniosynostosis 
For subtypes with craniosynostosis, surgery is required to prevent premature fusion of cranial sutures, such as the coronal suture (brachycephaly). Cranioplasty should be performed the first year of life to prevent disruptions in brain growth due to increased intracranial pressure. Additionally, surgery may be required to improve appearance, especially in unilateral coronal synostosis (anterior plagiocephaly). Midface surgery may also be required in childhood to detach the midface from the rest of the skull to correct respiratory and orthodontic problems.

Syndactyly 
Syndactyly in certain subtypes is rarely severe enough to affect hand function, so treatment may not be needed.

In more severe subtypes, as seen in Apert syndrome, surgical correction of syndactyly may be needed. Surgery is recommended to be performed as soon as possible, generally at 4 months of age. Treatment is dependent on the severity of syndactyly. The surgical treatment generally involves interdigital webspace release and thumb lengthening.

See also 
 List of skin conditions
 Oxycephaly

References

External links 

 

Genodermatoses